NASCAR Illustrated (formerly Winston Cup Illustrated) was a monthly magazine about NASCAR stock car racing. Established in 1982, it was closed by publisher American City Business Journals in mid-2016.

History
NASCAR Illustrated began publication in 1982. It was described as a "niche magazine".

In 2010, NASCAR Scene was shuttered and merged into Illustrated.

ACBJ notified employees of the magazine's stoppage of circulation via email in June 2016.

Staff
Liz Allison
Kelly Crandall
Cindy Elliott
Jim Fluharty
Claire B. Lang
Steve Waid
Ben White

References

Magazines established in 1982
Magazines disestablished in 2016
Defunct magazines published in the United States
Magazines published in North Carolina
Mass media in Charlotte, North Carolina
NASCAR magazines
Sports magazines published in the United States
Monthly magazines published in the United States